Giora Antman (born 15 November 1962) is a former Israeli football player and currently the goalkeeping coach at Maccabi Haifa.

Antman was the goalkeeping coach at Maccabi Haifa for 18 years until he was replaced in 2012 by Avi Peretz. After just one season with Hapoel Be'er Sheva, Antman returned to his familiar role as goalkeeping coach for Maccabi Haifa in June 2013.

Antman's sons, Niv and Ofek both play as goalkeepers, as does his sister-in-law, Iris Antman.

References

External links
  Profile and biography of Giora Antman on Maccabi Haifa's official website

1962 births
Living people
Israeli footballers
Hapoel Haifa F.C. players
Hapoel Beit She'an F.C. players
Hapoel Tel Aviv F.C. players
Hapoel Acre F.C. players
Hapoel Be'er Sheva F.C. players
Maccabi Haifa F.C. players
Beitar Jerusalem F.C. players
Hapoel Kfar Saba F.C. players
Maccabi Acre F.C. players
Footballers from Kiryat Motzkin
Liga Leumit players
Israel international footballers
Association football goalkeepers
Association football goalkeeping coaches